Vegas Pro (stylized as VEGAS Pro, colloquially called Sony Vegas) is a video editing software package for non-linear editing (NLE). The first release of Vegas Beta was on June 11, 1999. The software runs on Windows operating systems.

Originally developed as audio editing software, it became an NLE for video and audio, starting from version 2.0. Vegas Pro features real-time multitrack video and audio editing on unlimited tracks, resolution-independent video sequencing, complex effects, compositing tools, 24-bit/192 kHz audio support, VST and DirectX plug-in effect support, and Dolby Digital surround sound mixing.

The software was originally published by Sonic Foundry until May 2003, when Sony purchased Sonic Foundry and formed Sony Creative Software. On May 24, 2016, Sony announced that Vegas was sold to MAGIX, which formed VEGAS Creative Software, to continue support and development of the software.

Features 
Vegas does not require any specialized hardware to run properly, allowing it to operate on any Windows computer that meets the system requirements.

In the areas of compositing and motion graphics, Vegas provides a varied toolset, including a 3D track motion with control over z-depth, and spatial arrangement of visual planes including plane intersection.

Many of the visual effects processing in Vegas follow an audio-like paradigm. Effects can be applied at any stage of the visual signal flow or event level. Moreover, track level and output level effects, such as reverb, delay, and flange, are applied in a digital audio system, like Pro Tools, Cubase or Sonar. Master output effects can also be controlled and manipulated over time by the use of Master Bus track automation envelopes.

One major drawback of Vegas is that although it started as an Audio Multitrack NLE, it has no MIDI capability at all (with the exception of control-desk and synchronization). For this reason, the use of Vegas is restricted only for post-production audio or for the Video NLE market.

Vegas features integration with 24p DV. It is also one of the few NLEs which can convert other formats to 24p (or any other format) without any kind of a plug-in or third-party application support. It is the only NLE that allows multiple instances of the application to be opened simultaneously. Clips and sequences can be copied and pasted between instances of Vegas. One example of this can be rendering a sequence in the background, while the user continues to edit in a different instance of Vegas in the foreground. Vegas provides sophisticated compositing including green screen, masking, and key-frame animation. Nesting allows a prior project to be included in another project, modularizing the editing process so that an array of tracks and edits become one track for further editing. Any changes to the previous project become reflected in the later project. Nesting is especially helpful in large, complex or special effects projects, as the final rendering suffers no generation loss.

Version/variant history 

Each release of Vegas is sold standalone, however upgrade discounts are sometimes provided.

Vegas Beta 
Sonic Foundry introduced a sneak preview version of Vegas Pro on 11 June 1999. It is called a "Multitrack Media Editing System".

Full release

Vegas 1.0 
Released on 23 July 1999 at the NAMM Show in Nashville, Tennessee, Vegas was an audio-only tool with a particular focus on rescaling and resampling audio. It supported formats like DivX and Real Networks RealSystem G2 file formats.

Vegas Video beta (Vegas 2.0 beta) 
Released on 10 April 2000, this was the first version of Vegas to include video-editing tools.

Vegas Video (Vegas 2.0) 
Released on 12 June 2000.

Vegas Video LE 3.0

Vegas Video 3.0 
Released on 3 December 2001. This release added:
 New Video Effects – Lens Flare, Light Rays, Film FX, Color Curves, Mirror, Remap, Deform, Convolution, Linear Blur, Black Restore, Levels, Unsharp Mask, Color Grad, and Timecode Burn filter.
 Batch Capture with Automatic Scene Detection – Captures DV with automatic scene detection, batch capture, tape logging, still image capture and thumbnail previews.
 Red Book Audio CD Mastering with CD Architect(TM) Technology – Used for burning Red Book audio CD masters directly from the Vegas timeline with ISRC, UPC, and PQ list support.
 New Sonic Foundry DV Codec – Introduces a DV codec developed by Sonic Foundry that offers artifact-free compositing and DV chromakeying.
 DV Print-To-Tape From The Timeline – Prints projects to DV cameras and decks from the Vegas timeline.
 Windows Media(TM) File Editing – Creates and edits Windows Media(TM) files.
 New MPEG Encoding Tools – Used for producing MPEG-2 files for DVD productions.
 Dynamic RAM Previewing – Temporary RAM/render-free previews for analysis and tweaking of complex video FX without rendering.
 VideoCD and Data CD Burning – Burning projects directly to VideoCD for playback on most DVD players or data CDs for playback computers' CD-ROMs.

Vegas 4.0 
Released on 6 February 2003.
This release added:
 Advanced Color Correction Tools
 Searchable Media Pool Bins
 Vectorscope, Histogram, Parade and Waveform Monitoring
 Application Scripting
 Improved Ripple Editing
 Motion Blur and Super-Sampling Envelopes
 5.1 Surround Mixing
 Dolby® Digital AC-3 Encoding certified and tested by Dolby Laboratories
 DirectX® Audio Plug-In Effects Automation
 ASIO Driver Support
 Windows Media™ 9 Support, including Surround Encoding
DVD Authoring with AC-3 File Import Capabilities
 Integration with DVD Architect Via Chapter Marker Passing

Vegas 4.0b 
Released in April 2003; added HD editing and 24p support.

Vegas 4.0e 
Released in November 2003; This is the first release of Vegas under the ownership of Sony; Sonic Foundry had sold Vegas alongside Sound Forge and other programs to Sony Pictures Digital for US$18 Million that same year.

Vegas 5.0 
Released in April 2004.

Vegas 6.0 
Released on 18 April 2005.

Vegas 7.0 
Released in September 2006. Version 7 is the final Vegas release to include Windows 2000 support.

Vegas Pro 8.0 
Released on 10 September 2007.

The first Sony Vegas version to go with the "Sony Vegas Pro" branding instead of the regular "Sony Vegas" branding. It also moved the timeline to the bottom by default, but users can still move it back to the top.

Vegas Pro 8.1 
Vegas Pro 8.1 is the first version of Vegas Pro to be ported to 64-bit systems.

Vegas Pro 9.0 
On 11 May 2009, Sony Creative Software released Sony Vegas Pro 9.0 with greater support for digital cinema including:
 Support for 4K resolution
 Native support for pro camcorder formats such as Red and XDCAM EX

The latest release of Sony Vegas Pro 9.0 is Vegas Pro 9.0e (Released on 13 May 2010), which includes features such as new white balance video FX.

In 2009, Sony Creative Software purchased the Velvetmatter Radiance suite of video FX plug-ins and these are included in Vegas 9. As a result, they are no longer available as a separate product from Velvetmatter.

Vegas Pro 10 
Sony Vegas Pro 10, released on 11 October 2010. This release added:
 Stereoscopic 3D Editing
 Comprehensive Closed Captioning
 GPU-Accelerated AVC Encoding for limited formats (Using NVIDIA CUDA). With the release of Vegas 10d, support was extended to some AMD GPUs (via the OpenCL GPGPU API).
 Image Stabilization
 Audio Event FX
 Track Management
 Elastique Pitch Method
 OpenFX plugins support
 A few more updates and UI changes
Version 10 is the final Vegas Pro release to include Windows XP support.

Vegas Pro 11 
Sony announced Vegas Pro 11 on 9 September 2011, and it was released on 17 October 2011. Updated features include GPGPU acceleration of video decoding, effects, playback, compositing, pan/crop, transitions, and motion. Other improvements were to include enhanced text tools, enhanced stereoscopic/3D features, RAW photo support, and new event synchronization mechanisms. In addition, Vegas Pro 11 comes pre-loaded with "NewBlue" Titler Pro, a 2D and 3D titling plug-in.

Version 11 is the final Vegas Pro release to include 32-bit support.

n

Vegas Pro 12 
Sony released Vegas Pro 12 on 9 November 2012. Updated features include enhanced 4K support, more visual effects, and faster encoding performance. Vegas Pro 12 is dedicated to 64-bit versions of Windows.

Vegas Pro 13 
Sony released Vegas Pro 13 on 11 April 2014.
It brings new collaboration tools and streamlined workflows to professional content producers faced with a wide variety of multimedia production tasks. This is the final Vegas Pro release under Sony's ownership. The last Sony Vegas Pro 13 build was #453. MAGIX released a rebranded version build #545.

Available in three new configurations:
 Vegas Pro 13 Edit: Video and Audio Production
 Vegas Pro 13: Video, Audio, and Blu-ray Disc Creation
 Vegas Pro 13 Suite: Editing, Disc Authoring, and Visual Effects

Vegas Pro 14 
MAGIX released Vegas Pro 14 on 20 September 2016. This is the first release of Vegas Pro under the ownership of MAGIX. It features advanced 4K upscaling as well as various bug fixes, a higher video velocity limit, RED camera support and various other features. This was the last version of Vegas Pro to have the light theme set by default.

Vegas Pro 15 
Released on 28 August 2017, Vegas Pro 15 features major UI changes which claimed to bring usability improvements and customization. It was the first version of VEGAS Pro to have a dark theme, and it also allows more efficient editing speeds, including adding new shortcuts to speed up editing. Vegas Pro 15 includes support for Intel Quick Sync Video (QSV) and other technologies, as well as various other features. It introduced the VEGAS Pro icon to be a V.

Vegas Pro 16 
Released on 27 August 2018, Vegas Pro 16 has some new features including file backup, motion tracking, improved video stabilization, 360° editing and HDR support.

Vegas Pro 17 
Released on 5 August 2019. This release added:
ideo LE 3.0Nested timelines
Improved video stabilization
Planar motion tracking/video tracking
Smart Split Edit
Dynamic storyboard and timeline interaction
Bézier masking OFX-Plugin
Lens correction plug
Improved Picture-In-Picture OFX plug-in
Automatic slideshow creator
Screen capture
Improved multicamera editing
Improved color grading
Length show
Experimental MKV reader

Vegas Pro 18 
Released on 3 August 2020. This release added:

 Motion Tracker Panel
 Improved Video FX, Transitions and Media Generator windows
 8-Bit (full range) pixel format
 Black Bar Fill plug-in
 Denoiser plug-in
 Flicker Control plug-in
 Style Transfer plug-in
 Integrated graphics card driver update check
 The Lens Correction FX has got an additional zooming factor
 Export and Import of VEGAS Pro preferences
 Reworked screen capture utility VEGAS Capture
 Incremental Save
 A more detailed render progress dialog
 Swap video files
 New Video Scopes options
 VEGAS Prepare
 VEGAS Hub explorer window
 Alternate High DPI mode
 Logarithmic Exposure adjustment
 Some more legacy features were hidden by default, use Preferences > Deprecated Features
 Event edge handles

Vegas Pro 18 has suffered from serious stability issues, causing it to have a 35% positive review score on the distribution platform Steam.

Vegas Pro 19 
Released on 18 August 2021. This release added:

 Improved user interface
 Improved color grading
 Improved effects
 New cloud-integrated content management and acquisition.
 Live streaming

Vegas Pro 20 
Released on 10 August 2022. This release added:

 File Drop for fast collaboration
 Automatic project collections
 Local project archives
 Speech to Text functionality including automatic subtitle generation (official release - 365 subscribers only)
 White Balance controls in the Color Grading Panel
 Hue adjustment curves in the Color Grading Panel
 VST3 Support for audio editing (beta)
 VST 32-bit bridge (beta)
 Optical Flow mode for Warp Flow and Smart Split
 Real-time Optical Flow for the Slow Motion FX
 Normalize button for events
 Fade In/Out included in Paste Event Attributes
 Automatic region creation in Scene Detection
 Honeycomb and Color Planes presets for GL transitions

Reception 
Major broadcasters have utilized the software, such as Nightline with Ted Koppel. Several films have used Vegas to cut their features.

References

Further reading 

Book
 

News release
 

Review

External links 
 

Video editing software
Vegas
Windows-only software